Kandali Tarf Rahur is a village in the Thane district of Maharashtra, India. It is located in the Bhiwandi taluka. It is situated between AH47 (Mumbai-Nashik highway) and the Bhatsa River.

Demographics 

According to the 2011 census of India, Kandali Tarf Rahur has 140 households. The effective literacy rate (i.e. the literacy rate of population excluding children aged 6 and below) is 80.54%.

References 

Villages in Bhiwandi taluka